Andriy Volodymyrovych Porokhnya (born 17 February 1997) is a Ukrainian professional footballer who plays as a defender.

Career
He started his football career at Yunist Chernihiv in 2011 before moving to Arsenal Bila Tserkva in 2015. In 2017 he moved to FC Kudrivka.

FC Chernihiv 
On summer 2021, Porokhnya moved to FC Chernihiv in the Ukrainian Second League. On 24 July he made his debut with the new club against MFA Mukacheve. On 18 August he scored in 2021–22 Ukrainian Cup against Chaika Petropavlivska Borshchahivka. On 22 August he has been received a red card in the match against AFSC Kyiv at the 77 minute at the Chernihiv Arena. On 31 August he scored his second Ukrainian Cup goal against Alians Lypova Dolyna. On 16 October he scored his first league goal in a 3–0 victory over Lyubomyr Stavyshche. On 10 August 2022 he terminated his contract with the club by mutual consensus.

Druzhba Myrivka
In summer 2022 he moved to Druzhba Myrivka in the Chernihiv Oblast.

Career statistics

Club

Honours 
Inhulets-2 Petrove
 Kirovohrad Oblast Championship: 2015

References

External links
Official website of FC Chernihiv
Profile on official website of Ukrainian Second League

1997 births
Living people
Footballers from Chernihiv
FC Yunist Chernihiv players
FC Chernihiv players
FC Inhulets-2 Petrove players
FC Arsenal-Kyivshchyna Bila Tserkva players
FC Kudrivka players
Ukrainian footballers
Ukrainian Second League players
Association football midfielders